is a novel by Ivorian author Bernard Dadié. It won the Grand prix littéraire d'Afrique noire in 1968.

Ivorian novels
1967 novels
French-language novels
Grand prix littéraire d'Afrique noire winners